Rensselaer R. Herrick (January 29, 1826 – January 30, 1899) was an American politician of the Republican Party who served as the 26th Mayor of Cleveland, Ohio, from 1879 to 1882, and earlier as a Cleveland City Councilman. He is buried at Cleveland's Lake View Cemetery.

References

1826 births
1899 deaths
Mayors of Cleveland
Cleveland City Council members
Burials at Lake View Cemetery, Cleveland
Ohio Republicans